Winchester is a home rule-class city in and the county seat of Clark County, Kentucky, United States. The population was 18,368 at the 2010 census. It is part of the Lexington-Fayette, KY Metropolitan Statistical Area. Winchester is located roughly halfway between Louisville and Ashland.

History
It was named after Winchester, Virginia.

Geography
Kentucky Route 1958 (Bypass Road) is an outer loop around the town. Kentucky Route 627 (Boonesborough Road) leads towards Richmond,  to the south and Paris to the north. U.S. Route 60 (Winchester-Lexington Road/Lexington Avenue) runs through downtown Winchester. Interstate 64 passes through the northern part of the city, with access from exits 94 and 96.

Climate
The climate in this area is characterized by hot, humid summers and generally mild to cool winters.  According to the Köppen Climate Classification system, Winchester has a humid subtropical climate, abbreviated "Cfa" on climate maps.

Demographics

As of the census of 2000, there were 16,724 people, 6,907 households, and 4,620 families residing in the city. The racial makeup of the city was 88.94% White, 8.83% African American, 0.22% Native American, 0.25% Asian, 0.01% Pacific Islander, 0.81% from other races, and 0.94% from two or more races. Hispanic or Latino of any race were 1.60% of the population.

There were 6,907 households, out of which 31.4% had children under the age of 18 living with them, 47.0% were married couples living together, 16.4% had a female householder with no husband present, and 33.1% were non-families. 28.5% of all households were made up of individuals, and 12.6% had someone living alone who was 65 years of age or older. The average household size was 2.39 and the average family size was 2.93.

In the city, the population was spread out, with 24.9% under the age of 18, 9.9% from 18 to 24, 30.0% from 25 to 44, 21.1% from 45 to 64, and 14.0% who were 65 years of age or older. The median age was 35 years. For every 100 females, there were 88.7 males. For every 100 females age 18 and over, there were 84.4 males.

The median income for a household in the city was $31,254, and the median income for a family was $36,797. Males had a median income of $31,295 versus $21,747 for females. The per capita income for the city was $15,611. About 13.1% of families and 15.5% of the population were below the poverty line, including 21.1% of those under age 18 and 14.4% of those age 65 or over.

Economy

Small business 
Ale-8-One, a Kentucky-specific brand of soft drink, has been bottled in Winchester since 1926.

Arts and culture

Beer Cheese Festival
Winchester is home to the Beer Cheese Festival held annually in June. Beer Cheese was developed in Clark County near Winchester in the 1940s.

Historic sites
 Bluegrass Heritage Museum
 Clark County Court House
 Clark Mansion (Gov. Clark House)
 Indian old fields
 Kerr Building
 Leeds Theater
 Oakwood Estate
 Old Providence Church
 Winchester Opera House

Education

High school
Winchester students attend George Rogers Clark High School, located southwest of Winchester in Clark County.

Higher education 
Winchester has been home to several higher education establishments. Kentucky Wesleyan College was located in the city from 1890 to 1954. When Kentucky Wesleyan left, the local Churches of Christ organized Southeastern Christian College on the former Kentucky Wesleyan campus. After Southeastern Christian College folded in 1979, the campus was preserved as a public park. Today, Clark County is home to the Winchester Campus of Bluegrass Community and Technical College.

Public library
Winchester has a lending library, the Clark County Public Library.

Transportation
Interstate 64 runs east-west through the northern part of Winchester. U.S. Route 60 runs east-west through Winchester. Kentucky Route 627 runs north-south through Winchester.

Blue Grass Airport, 29 miles to the west, in the western part of Lexington, is one of the busiest commercial airports in the state.

The Louisville and Nashville Railroad had run trains east-west and north-south through Winchester. The last L&N passenger train was an unnamed Cincinnati - Atlanta remnant of the former Cincinnati - Jacksonville Flamingo; it was discontinued on March 7, 1968.

Notable people

 Armstead M. Alexander (1834–1892), congressman from Missouri
 Chilton Allan (1786–1858), congressman from Kentucky
 Yeremiah Bell, safety for the New York Jets NFL team
 Rex Burkhead, running back for the Houston Texans NFL Team
 George French Ecton, second African-American state legislator in Illinois
 John E. Fryer, psychiatrist whose speech in 1972 as "Dr. Henry Anonymous" helped to get homosexuality removed as a mental disease from the American Psychiatric Association's Diagnostic and Statistical Manual
 Matt Ginter,  Professional Baseball 1999–2010 (11 years)
 William Harrow (1822–1871), Union general in the Civil War
 Joel Tanner Hart (1810–1877), sculptor
 Joseph Jackson (screenwriter), film representative and most successful writers for Hollywood talking films. entered films in 1918 as publicity representative.
 Preston Knowles, basketball player for the University of Louisville
 Homer Ledford (1927–2006), instrument maker and bluegrass musician
 Matt Long, TV's "Jack & Bobby", "Mad Men", "Helix".
 Captain John Strode (1729-1805), founder of Strode Station, the first station in Clark County established in 1779
 Claude Sullivan, sports broadcaster
 Allen Tate (1899–1979), poet associated with the Agrarians, a group of Southern poets, and most noted for "Ode to the Confederate Dead"
 Helen Thomas, White House press correspondent
 Nettie George Speedy (1878-1957), journalist of Chicago Defender, founder of Chicago Women's Golf Club, the first woman to sit on the trustee board of Lane College, and the Pioneer of African American golf.

In popular culture
A 2018 episode of The Dead Files was filmed in Winchester.

Sister cities 
Winchester has two sister cities, as designated by Sister Cities International:
 Ibarra, Imbabura, Ecuador
 Etawah, Uttar Pradesh, India

References

External links

 
Cities in Clark County, Kentucky
Cities in Kentucky
County seats in Kentucky
Lexington–Fayette metropolitan area